Agrilus cuprescens, known generally as the rose stem girdler or bronze cane borer, is a species of metallic wood-boring beetle in the family Buprestidae. It is found in Europe and Northern Asia (excluding China) and North America.

Subspecies
These six subspecies belong to the species Agrilus cuprescens:
 Agrilus cuprescens amethystopterus Semenov, 1890
 Agrilus cuprescens caenus Obenberger, 1924
 Agrilus cuprescens calcicola Obenberger, 1916
 Agrilus cuprescens chrysoderes Abeille de Perrin, 1891
 Agrilus cuprescens cuprescens (Ménétriés, 1832)
 Agrilus cuprescens paludicola Krogerus, 1923

References

Further reading

External links

 

cuprescens
Beetles described in 1832